Chirakkalkulam is a small residential area near Kannur town of Kannur District, Kerala state, South India. Chirakkalkulam is located between Thayatheru and Kannur City. Chirakkalkulam's significance arises from the birth of the historic Arakkal Kingdom.

Local legend
Centuries back Kolathu Nadu (present Kannur district and near places) was ruled by Chirakkal Raja. While bathing in the Chirakkal kulam (pond), the daughter of the then ruler was drowned. Seeing this her friends cried and shouted. They were unable to rescue her. By the same time a Muslim boy walking nearby heard the shouting and went to see what was happening. He saw a girl was drowning in the pond. He knew it was the princess but at first he hesitated to save her because in that time there was untouchability practiced in Kerala. That means if a lower caste person touch a higher caste person it was considered as a sin and some times he may even lose his life.

The boy anyway jumped in to the pond and saved her. Seeing that the girl was naked, the boy gave his mundu — a long cloth used to cover the lower part of the body.

When this news reached the ruler, he called both her daughter and the Muslim boy to him. The boy was so afraid that he thought he will lose his life. As per the custom in that days, if a man gives a "pudava" (a long cloth used for covering body) to an unmarried woman, it is considered as if he and she got married.

The elders and religious people advised the ruler that, two thing happened here, one is that the king's daughter was touched by a Muslim the second thing was a boy gave pudava to his daughter (by giving boys mundu to the girl), meaning that the daughter cannot enter the palace anymore and also she got married by the Muslim boy.

As per the custom the ruler had no other choice but give her daughter to the Muslim boy. The Raja was unhappy to give his daughter to a poor family, so he gave the boy some part of his country, and made him the ruler of that part.

The area which was given to the boy was then onwards known as Arakkal and his family, Arakkal family. The ruler's daughter was known as the Arakkal Beebi.

Many people believe that the place was named after the Chirakkal kulam (kulam means pond in Malayalam language).

See also 
 Arakkal Kingdom
 Kannur City
 Thayatheru
 Kannur
 Chalad

Suburbs of Kannur